The 1980–81 season was the 62nd season in the history of AS Saint-Étienne and the club's 18th consecutive season in the top flight of French football. In addition to the domestic league, Saint-Étienne took part in this season's editions of the Coupe de France and UEFA Cup.

Players

First-team squad

Pre-season and friendlies

Competitions

Overall record

Division 1

League table

Results summary

Results by round

Matches

Coupe de France

Round of 16

Quarter-finals

Semi-finals

Final

UEFA Cup

First round

Second round

Third round

Quarter-finals

References

AS Saint-Étienne seasons
Saint-Étienne
French football championship-winning seasons